Mary Ann Harris Gay (March 18, 1829 – November 21, 1918) was an American writer and poet from Decatur, Georgia, known for her Civil War memoir Life in Dixie During the War (1897). This described events in Atlanta during the war. Author Margaret Mitchell said this memoir inspired some of her passages in her novel Gone with the Wind (1936). Gay also published a book of poetry (1858), which she republished after the war to raise money to help support her mother and sister.

She also was active in the work to preserve Confederate battlefields and helped raise money to construct monuments and cemeteries. Gay raised thousands of dollars in Texas to pay for a fence and gate at the newly established McGavock Confederate Cemetery in 1866 in Franklin, Tennessee. Her brother was among the nearly 2,000 Confederates reinterred there from temporary battlefield graves.

In 1997 Gay was named a Georgia Woman of Achievement. Her home during and after the Civil War, the Mary Gay House, has been preserved in downtown Decatur. It is listed on the National Register of Historic Places.

Biography
Mary Ann Gay was born to William and Mary (Stevens) Gay on March 18, 1829, in Jones County, Georgia. Shortly after Mary Ann was born, her father died. Her newly widowed mother moved with her children back to her family near Milledgeville, Georgia. They lived in the house of Mary Gay's grandfather, Thomas Stevens, a planter and slave owner. He was depicted harshly in the book A Slave Life in Georgia (1854) by John Brown, one of his slaves who escaped and settled in England, where his memoir was first published.

Stevens also owned property around the state, including in DeKalb County, where he became active in politics by 1829. In the 1830s, Mary's mother moved with her to Decatur, the county seat. There she married Joseph Stokes, a lawyer who had her father and brothers as a client. They moved out to Cassville, Georgia, and Mary Stokes had two more children with Joseph: Thomas (Thomie) J. Stokes (b. 1837) and Missouria Horton Stokes (b. 1838). Mary Stokes' father Thomas Stevens lived with them. By his bequest, the young Mary Gay was sent to Nashville for four years of school at a girls' academy.

When Stokes died in 1850, Gay's newly widowed mother moved with her three children to a house on Marshall Street in Decatur, Georgia. Gay lived in this house throughout the years of the Civil War. She published her first poetry collection in 1858, anonymously, at age 29.

During the Civil War, Mary Gay was a loyal supporter of the Confederate side. She refused to leave her house even when Union Army soldiers took over the area. Gen. Kenner Garrard occupied her house at one point, and his troops camped in her yard. Her only brother, Thomas Stokes, served under Gen. John Bell Hood in the Confederate Army and died in the Battle of Franklin in late 1864.

After the war Gay worked to preserve Confederate battlefields and to raise memorials to honor Confederate soldiers in the war. She also helped raise funds for the construction of a new building for the local Baptist church in Decatur.

Another project was to fund the reburial to a new cemetery of the 1,750 Confederate dead from the Battle of Franklin, including her brother who had died there. Gay traveled to Texas, where she raised several thousand dollars to support the creation of McGavock Confederate Cemetery. The funds were enough to enclose the cemetery with an iron fence and gate, which was marked with a plaque with her name. She also successfully campaigned for a memorial to Alexander H. Stephens at his grave at Liberty Hall.

Gay reprinted her book Prose and Poetry (1858) after the war and marketed it "aggressively" in order to support her family. The book came to the attention of Mark Twain, who quoted it "with disdain" in Chapter 21 of The Adventures of Tom Sawyer (1876). He wrote that Gay's work was "after the school-girl pattern."

In 1892 Gay published her war memoir Life in Dixie During the War based on her memories, her half-sister Missouria's journal, and letters from her half-brother Thomas. Covering the years from 1861 through 1865, it became her best-known work. It influenced Margaret Mitchell's novel Gone With the Wind (1936); some scenes are drawn "directly from Gay's memoir".

Gay also wrote a novel, The Transplanted: A Story of Dixie Before the War (1907), with an introduction by Walter Neale, the New York publisher. It opens in the 1840s on a Mississippi plantation owned by a man of Scots descent.

Historians have explored the important role of planter and middle-class women in creating the memory and history of the Civil War. For instance, the United Daughters of the Confederacy had organized, initially to raise funds to get the Confederate dead decently buried in cemeteries. They also raised money to erect monuments to the war and their dead. In addition, by the late 19th century, its leaders encouraged Southern women such as Gay to publish their memoirs and other writings about the war, in order to tell their side of the conflict. They helped them find publishers, and also began to influence the content of textbooks. It was the beginning of formation of Southern memory about the war, the "Lost Cause", and a view that excluded slavery as basic to the conflict.

Gay never married. After the death of her sister Missouria in 1909, Gay began to suffer from dementia in her old age. She was committed to the Georgia State Sanitarium in 1915, where she died on November 21, 1918. She is buried in Decatur Cemetery.

Honors
In 1997 Gay was inducted into the Georgia Women of Achievement Hall of Fame.  Her home in Decatur has been preserved as the Mary Gay House and is listed on the National Register of Historic Places.

Works

References

Notes

Sources

External links

 
 

1829 births
1918 deaths
American women poets
19th-century American women writers
People from Decatur, Georgia
People of Georgia (U.S. state) in the American Civil War
Writers from Georgia (U.S. state)
19th-century American poets
People from Jones County, Georgia